The Sierra Club is an environmental organization with chapters in all 50 United States, Washington D.C., and Puerto Rico. The club was founded on May 28, 1892, in San Francisco, California, by Scottish-American preservationist John Muir, who became the first president as well as the longest-serving president, at approximately 20 years in this leadership position. The Sierra Club operates only in the United States and holds the legal status of 501(c)(4) nonprofit social welfare organization. Sierra Club Canada is a separate entity.

Traditionally associated with the progressive movement, the club was one of the first large-scale environmental preservation organizations in the world, and currently engages in lobbying politicians to promote environmentalist policies. Recent focuses of the club include promoting sustainable energy and mitigating global warming, as well as opposition to the use of coal, hydropower and nuclear power. The organization takes strong positions on issues that sometimes creates controversy, criticism, or opposition either internally or externally or both. The club is known for its political endorsements generally supporting liberal and progressive candidates in elections.

In addition to political advocacy, the Sierra Club organizes outdoor recreation activities, and has historically been a notable organization for mountaineering and rock climbing in the United States. Members of the Sierra Club pioneered the Yosemite Decimal System of climbing, and were responsible for a substantial amount of the early development of climbing. Much of this activity occurred in the group's namesake Sierra Nevada.

Overview
The Sierra Club's stated mission is "To explore, enjoy, and protect the wild places of the earth; To practice and promote the responsible use of the earth's ecosystems and resources; To educate and enlist humanity to protect and restore the quality of the natural and human environment; and to use all lawful means to carry out these objectives."

The Sierra Club is governed by a 15-member Board of Directors. Each year, five directors are elected to three-year terms, and all club members are eligible to vote. A president is elected annually by the Board from among its members. The executive director runs the day-to-day operations of the group. Michael Brune, formerly of Rainforest Action Network, has served as the organization's executive director since 2010. Brune succeeded Carl Pope. Pope stepped down amid discontent that the group had strayed from its core principles.

The Sierra Club is organized on both a national and state level with chapters named for the 50 states and two U.S. territories (Puerto Rico and Washington D.C.) California is the lone state to have numerous chapters named for California counties. The club chapters allow for regional groups and committees, some of which have many thousands of members. These chapters further allow for special interest sections (ex. Camera, Outings), committees (conservation and political), and task forces on a single issue with some kind of geography involved. While much activity is coordinated at a local level, the club is a unified organization; decisions made at the national level take precedence, including the removal and creation of Chapters, as well as recruiting and removing members.

The club is known for engaging in two main activities: promoting and guiding outdoor recreational activities, which is done throughout the United States but primarily in California (especially Southern California), and political activism to promote environmental causes. Sierra Club has been described as one of the United States' "leading environmental organizations." The Sierra Club makes endorsements of individual candidates for elected office.

History

Founding 
Journalist Robert Underwood Johnson had worked with John Muir on the successful campaign to create a large Yosemite National Park surrounding the much smaller state park which had been created in 1864.  This campaign succeeded in 1890. As early as 1889, Johnson had encouraged Muir to form an "association" to help protect the Sierra Nevada, and preliminary meetings were held to plan the group. Others involved in the early planning included artist William Keith, Willis Linn Jepson, Warren Olney, Willard Drake Johnson, Joseph LeConte and David Starr Jordan.

In May 1892, the young botany professor, Willis Linn Jepson from the University of California, Berkeley helped Muir and attorney Warren Olney launched the new organization modeled after the eastern Appalachian Mountain Club. The charter members of the Sierra Club elected Muir president, an office he held until his death in 1914.

The first goals of the club included establishing Glacier and Mount Rainier national parks, convincing the California legislature to give Yosemite Valley to the U.S. federal government, and preserving coastal redwood forests of California.

Muir escorted President Theodore Roosevelt through Yosemite in 1903, and two years later the California legislature ceded Yosemite Valley and Mariposa Grove to the federal government. The Sierra Club won its first lobbying victory with the creation of the country's second national park, after Yellowstone in 1872.

In 2020, in wake of the George Floyd protests and subsequent public reconciliation of systematic racism in public history, the Sierra Club described their own early history as intermingled with racism. In particular, the early Sierra Club favored the needs of white members to the exclusion of people of color, and Muir and some of his associates, such as Joseph LeConte, David Starr Jordan, and Henry Fairfield Osborn were closely related to the early eugenics movement in the United States. Osborn cofounded the American Eugenics Society, which called Jews and other non-whites as racially inferior to white people.

Environmental action over the Hetch Hetchy Reservoir 

In the first decade of the 1900s, the Sierra Club became embroiled in the Hetch Hetchy Reservoir battle that divided preservationists from "resource management" conservationists. In the late 19th century, the city of San Francisco was rapidly outgrowing its limited water supply, which depended on intermittent local springs and streams. In 1890, San Francisco mayor James D. Phelan proposed to build a dam and aqueduct on the Tuolumne River, one of the largest southern Sierra rivers, as a way to increase and stabilize the city's water supply.

Gifford Pinchot, a progressive supporter of public utilities and head of the US Forest Service, which then had jurisdiction over the national parks, supported the creation of the Hetch Hetchy dam. Muir appealed to his friend U.S. President Roosevelt, who would not commit himself against the dam, given its popularity with the people of San Francisco (a referendum in 1908 confirmed a seven-to-one majority in favor of the dam and municipal water). Muir and attorney William Edward Colby began a national campaign against the dam, attracting the support of many eastern conservationists. With the 1912 election of U.S. President Woodrow Wilson, who carried San Francisco, supporters of the dam had a friend in the White House.

The bill to dam Hetch Hetchy passed Congress in 1913, and so the Sierra Club lost its first major battle. In retaliation, the club supported creation of the National Park Service in 1916, to remove the parks from Forest Service oversight. Stephen Mather, a Club member from Chicago and an opponent of the Hetch Hetchy dam, became the first National Park Service director.

1920s–1940s 
During the 1920s and 1930s, the Sierra Club functioned as a social and recreational society, conducting outings, maintaining trails and building huts and lodges in the Sierra. Preservation campaigns included a several-year effort to enlarge Sequoia National Park (achieved in 1926) and over three decades of work to protect and then preserve Kings Canyon National Park (established in 1940). Historian Stephen Fox notes, "In the 1930s most of the three thousand members were middle-aged Republicans."

The New Deal brought many conservationists to the Democratic Party, and many Democrats entered the ranks of conservationists. Leading the generation of Young Turks who revitalized the Sierra Club after World War II were attorneys Richard Leonard and Bestor Robinson, nature photographer Ansel Adams, and David Brower.

Adams sponsored Brower for membership in the club, and he was appointed to the editorial board of the Sierra Club Bulletin. After World War II Brower returned to his job with the University of California Press, and began editing the Sierra Club Bulletin in 1946.

National reach

In 1950, the Sierra Club had some 7,000 members, mostly on the West Coast. That year the Atlantic chapter became the first formed outside California. An active volunteer board of directors ran the organization, assisted by a small clerical staff. Brower was appointed the first executive director in 1952, and the club began to catch up with major conservation organizations such as the National Audubon Society, National Wildlife Federation, The Wilderness Society, and Izaak Walton League, which had long had professional staff.

The Sierra Club secured its national reputation in the battle against the Echo Park Dam in Dinosaur National Monument in Utah, which had been announced by the Bureau of Reclamation in 1950. Brower led the fight, marshaling support from other conservation groups. Brower's background in publishing proved decisive; with the help of publisher Alfred Knopf, This Is Dinosaur was rushed into press. Invoking the specter of Hetch Hetchy, conservationists effectively lobbied Congress, which deleted the Echo Park dam from the Colorado River project as approved in 1955. Recognition of the Sierra Club's role in the Echo Park dam victory boosted membership from 10,000 in 1956 to 15,000 in 1960.

The Sierra Club was now truly a national conservation organization, and preservationists took the offensive with wilderness proposals. The club's Biennial Wilderness Conferences, launched in 1949 in concert with The Wilderness Society, became an important force in the campaign that secured passage of the Wilderness Act in 1964,  marking the first time that public lands (9.1 million acres) were permanently protected from development. Grand Teton National Park and Olympic National Park were also enlarged at the Sierra Club’s urging.

Book series 
In 1960, Brower launched the Exhibit Format book series with This Is the American Earth, and in 1962 In Wildness Is the Preservation of the World, with color photographs by Eliot Porter. These coffee-table books, published by their Sierra Club Books division, introduced the Sierra Club to a wider audience. Fifty thousand copies were sold in the first four years, and by 1960 sales exceeded $10 million. Soon Brower was publishing two new titles a year in the Exhibit Format series, but not all did as well as In Wildness. Although the books were successful in introducing the public to wilderness preservation and the Sierra Club, they lost money for the organization, some $60,000 a year after 1964. Financial management became a matter of contention between Brower and his board of directors.

Grand Canyon campaign 
The Sierra Club's most publicized crusade of the 1960s was the effort to stop the Bureau of Reclamation from building two dams that would flood portions of the Grand Canyon. The book Time and the River Flowing: Grand Canyon authored by Francois Leydet was published in the Exhibit Format book series. Opposing the Bridge Canyon and Marble Canyon dam projects, full-page ads the club placed in The New York Times and The Washington Post in 1966 exclaimed, "This time it's the Grand Canyon they want to flood," and asked, "Should we also flood the Sistine Chapel so tourists can get nearer the ceiling?" The ads generated a storm of protest to the Congress, prompting the Internal Revenue Service to announce it was suspending the Sierra Club's 501(c)(3) status pending an investigation. The board had taken the precaution of setting up the Sierra Club Foundation as a (c)(3) organization in 1960 for endowments and contributions for educational and other non-lobbying activities. Even so, contributions to the club dropped off, aggravating its annual operating deficits. Membership, however, climbed sharply in response to the investigation into the legitimacy of the society's tax status by the IRS from 30,000 in 1965 to 57,000 in 1967 and 75,000 in 1969.

The victory over the dam projects and challenges from the IRS did not come without costs. To make up for the power that would have been produced by the dams, the Sierra Club actually advocated for coal power plants. The result of the campaign and its trade-off was, in the words of historian Andrew Needham, that "the Grand Canyon became protected, sacred space," while "the Navajo Reservation"—which housed some of the main power plants picking up the slack—"became increasingly industrial."

End of the Brower era 
Despite the club's success in blocking plans for the Grand Canyon dams and weathering the transition from 501(c)(3) to 501(c)(4) status, tension grew over finances between Brower and the board of directors. The club's annual deficits rose from $100,000 in 1967 and 1968 to some $200,000 in 1969. Another conflict occurred over the club's policy toward the nuclear power plant to be constructed by Pacific Gas and Electric (PG&E) at Diablo Canyon near San Luis Obispo, California. Although the club had played the leading role blocking PG&E's nuclear power plant proposed for Bodega Bay, California, in the early 1960s, that case had been built around the local environmental impact and earthquake danger from the nearby San Andreas fault, not from opposition to nuclear power itself. In exchange for moving the new proposed site from the environmentally sensitive Nipomo Dunes to Diablo Canyon, the board of directors voted to support PG&E's plan for the power plant. A membership referendum in 1967 upheld the board's decision. But Brower concluded that nuclear power at any location was a mistake, and he voiced his opposition to the plant, contrary to the club's official policy. As pro- and anti-Brower factions polarized, the annual election of new directors reflected the conflict. Brower's supporters won a majority in 1968, but in the April 1969 election the anti-Brower candidates won all five open positions. Ansel Adams and president Richard Leonard, two of his closest friends on the board, led the opposition to Brower, charging him with financial recklessness and insubordination and calling for his ouster as executive director. The board voted ten to five to accept Brower's resignation. Eventually reconciled with the club, Brower was elected to the board of directors for a term from 1983 to 1988, and again from 1995 to 2000. Brower resigned from the board in 2000.

McCloskey years 

Michael McCloskey, hired by Brower in 1961 as the club's first northwest field representative, became the club's second executive director in 1969. An administrator attentive to detail, McCloskey had set up the club's conservation department in 1965 and guided the campaigns to save the Grand Canyon and establish Redwoods National Park and North Cascades National Park. During the 1970s, McCloskey led the club's legislative activity—preserving Alaskan lands and eastern wilderness areas, and supporting the new environmental agenda: the Toxic Substances Control Act of 1976, the Clean Air Act amendments, and the Surface Mining Control and Reclamation Act of 1977, passed during the administration of President Jimmy Carter. Efforts of the Sierra Club and others—including Black community organizers who fought against destructive "urban renewal" projects—led to passage of the National Environmental Policy Act and the Water Pollution Control Act.

The Sierra Club formed a political committee and made its first presidential endorsement in 1984 in support of Walter Mondale's unsuccessful campaign to unseat Ronald Reagan. McCloskey resigned as executive director in 1985 after  years (the same length of time Brower had led the organization), and assumed the title of chairman, becoming the club's senior strategist, devoting his time to conservation policy rather than budget planning and administration. After a two-year interlude with Douglas Wheeler, whose Republican credentials were disconcerting to liberal members, the club hired Michael Fischer, the former head of the California Coastal Commission, who served as executive director from 1987 to 1992. Carl Pope, formerly the club's legislative director, was named executive director in 1992.

Lobbying within the club 
In the 1990s, club members Jim Bensman, Roger Clarke, David Dilworth, Chad Hanson and David Orr along with about 2,000 members formed the John Muir Sierrans (JMS), an internal caucus, to promote changes to club positions. They favored a zero-cut forest policy on public lands and, a few years later, decommissioning Glen Canyon Dam. JMS was successful in changing club positions on both counts.

21st century 
In 2008, several Sierra Club officers quit in protest after the Sierra Club agreed to promote products by Clorox, which had been named one of a "dangerous dozen" chemical companies by the Public Interest Research Group in 2004. According to Carl Pope, the Sierra Club chairman, the deal brought the club US$1.3 million over the four-year term of the contract. In November 2011, Sierra Club chairman Carl Pope stepped down amid discontent about the Clorox deal and other issues.

Between 2007 and 2010, the Sierra Club accepted over US$25 million in donations from the gas industry, mostly from Aubrey McClendon, CEO of Chesapeake Energy, a large gas drilling company involved in fracking.

In January 2013, executive director Michael Brune announced  that the Sierra Club would officially participate in the first civil disobedience action in its 120-year history as part of the ongoing protest calling on the Obama administration to reject the Keystone XL tar sands pipeline, stating, "We are watching a global crisis unfold before our eyes, and to stand aside and let it happen—even though we know how to stop it—would be unconscionable." On 13 February 2013, Brune was arrested along with forty-eight people, including civil rights leader Julian Bond and NASA climate scientist James Hansen.

In May 2015, the Sierra Club appointed its first black president of the board of directors, Aaron Mair.

The Sierra Club endorsed Hillary Clinton in the 2016 U.S. presidential election. It endorsed Joe Biden in the 2020 U.S. presidential election, citing its opposition to Donald Trump's environmental deregulation.

The interim executive director (as of October, 2022) is Loren Blackford. Former NAACP director Ben Jealous will assume the position of executive director in January, 2023.

Outdoor programs

Mountaineering
In 1901, William Colby organized the first Sierra Club excursion to Yosemite Valley. The annual High Trips were led by mountaineers  such as Francis P. Farquhar, Joseph Nisbet LeConte, Norman Clyde, Walter A. Starr, Jr., Jules Eichorn, Glen Dawson, Ansel Adams, and David R. Brower. A number of first ascents  in the Sierra Nevada were made on Sierra Club outings. Sierra Club members were also early enthusiasts of rock climbing. In 1911, the first chapter was formed, Angeles, and it began conducting local excursions in the mountains surrounding Los Angeles and throughout the West. Steve Roper's Fifty Classic Climbs of North America, sponsored and published by the Sierra Club, is still considered one of the definitive rock climbing guidebooks in the United States. The Wilderness Travel Course is a basic mountaineering class that is administered by the Sierra Club.

The Sierra Club does not set standards for or regulate alpinism, but it organizes wilderness courses, hikes, and occasional alpine expeditions for members. In California, the club, through its outdoor recreation groups, is usually considered the state's analogue to other state mountaineering clubs such as Mazamas,  The Mountaineers, or the Colorado Mountain Club. Due to an increasing focus on political activity and concerns about financial liability, mountaineering activity in the Sierra Club has subsided since the 1980s. Some chapters, mostly in California, continue to maintain large mountaineering programs. The club currently occasionally awards the Francis P. Farquhar Mountaineering Award to outstanding member mountaineers.

Hiking and outings
In World War II, a number of Sierra Club leaders joined the 10th Mountain Division. Among them was David R. Brower, who managed the High Trip program from 1947 to 1954, while serving as a major in the Army Reserve.

In many areas of the country, Sierra Club also organizes hiking tours. Sierra Club's website has a "hiking near me" function. Section "Sierra Club Near You" shows all the upcoming trips in nearby area.

The historic High Trips, sometimes large expeditions with more than a hundred participants and crew, have given way to smaller and more numerous excursions held across the United States and abroad. These outings form a major part of Sierra Club culture, and in some chapters, constitute the majority of member activity. Other chapters, however, may sponsor very few outdoor or recreational activities, being focused solely on political advocacy. Generally, chapters in California are much more active with regard to outdoor activities.

Sierra Club awards

The Sierra Club presents a number of annual awards, such as the Sierra Club John Muir Award, the Ansel Adams Award for Conservation Photography, the Francis P. Farquhar Mountaineering Award, the Edgar Wayburn Award for public officials, the Rachel Carson Award for journalists and writers, the William O. Douglas Award for legal work, and the EarthCare Award for international environmental protection and conservation.

Policy positions

Land management
Land management, access, conservation are traditionally considered the core advocacy areas of the Sierra Club. Uniquely for a progressive organization, the Sierra Club has strong grassroots organization in rural areas, with much activity focused on ensuring equitable and environmentally-friendly use of public lands. This is particularly accentuated by the fact that the club attracts many people who primarily join the club for recreation and use of public land for hiking.

Some Sierra Club members have urged the club to be more forceful in advocating for the protection of National Forests and other federally owned public lands. For example, in 2002 the club was criticized for joining with the Wilderness Society in agreeing to a compromise that would allow logging in the Black Hills in South Dakota.

Opposition to coal

A goal of the Sierra Club is to replace coal with other energy sources. Through its "Beyond Coal" campaign, the Sierra Club has set a goal to close half of all coal plants in the U.S. by 2017. American business magnate and former New York City mayor Michael Bloomberg donated $50 million to the Sierra Club's anti-coal work in 2011, and announced another $30 million gift to Sierra's Beyond Coal campaign in 2015. The Beyond Coal campaign says 187 coal plants have been closed since 2010. Other funders of the Sierra Club's anti-coal campaign include the William and Flora Hewlett Foundation and the John D. and Catherine T. MacArthur Foundation. The CEO of Chesapeake Energy, a natural gas company, donated $26 million to the Beyond Coal campaign between 2007 and 2010.

Opposition to nuclear power 
The Sierra Club is "unequivocally opposed" to nuclear power.

Opposition to hydropower and dams
The Sierra Club has lobbied against hydropower projects and large-scale dams. In lobbying against hydropower projects, the Sierra Club has expressed opposition to power lines and said that hydropower projects disrupt animal habitats.

The Sierra Club opposes dams it considers inappropriate, including some government-built dams in national parks. In the early 20th century, the organization fought against the damming and flooding of the Hetch Hetchy Valley in Yosemite National Park. Despite this lobbying, Congress authorized the construction of O'Shaughnessy Dam on the Tuolumne River. The Sierra Club continues to support removal of the dam.

The Sierra Club advocates the decommissioning of Glen Canyon Dam and the draining of Lake Powell. The club also supports removal, breaching or decommissioning of many other dams, including four dams on the lower Snake River in eastern Washington. The Sierra Club opposes the importation of energy from Quebec's hydropower plants to New York, arguing that importing excess energy by the Quebec plants will cause environmental damage and lead to fewer in-state New York renewable energy projects.

Mixed views on solar projects
Some chapters of the Sierra Club have lobbied against solar power projects, whereas other chapters have defended solar power projects. The Sierra Club opposed the Battle Born Solar Project, the largest solar project in the U.S., citing its potential impact on desert tortoise habitats.

Opposition to streamlined permitting
In response to proposed reforms to streamline the permitting process for environmental projects amid concerns that environmental permitting reviews were delaying and blocking projects with a beneficial environmental impact, the Sierra Club expressed opposition to such reforms, arguing "Whatever the proposed project is — whether it’s a pipeline or a highway or a solar farm — it should be subject to the same commonsense review process. If we want these projects to move forward faster, we shouldn’t be weakening environmental laws, but investing more resources into the agencies and staff."

Alliance with organized labor

The Sierra Club is a member of the BlueGreen Alliance, a coalition of environmental groups and labor unions.  The BlueGreen Alliance was formed in 2006 and grew out of a less-formal collaboration between the Sierra Club and the United Steelworkers. In 2012, the Laborers' International Union of North America left the coalition due to the Sierra Club and other environmental groups' opposition to the Keystone Pipeline.

Population and immigration
Immigration was historically among the most divisive issues within the club. In 1996, after years of debate, the Sierra Club adopted a neutral position on immigration levels. As the club has shifted to the left over the years, this position was amended in 2013 to support "an equitable path to citizenship for undocumented immigrants".

Although the position of the Sierra Club has generally been favorable towards immigration, some critics of the Sierra Club have charged that the efforts of some club members to restrain immigration, are a continuation of aspects of human population control and the eugenics movement. In 1969, the Sierra Club published Paul R. Ehrlich's book, The Population Bomb, in which he said that population growth was responsible for environmental decline and advocated coercive measures to reduce it. Some observers have argued that the book had a "racial dimension" in the tradition of the Eugenics movement, and that it "reiterated many of Osborn's jeremiads."

During the 1980s, some Sierra Club members, including Paul Ehrlich's wife Anne, wanted to take the club into the contentious field of immigration to the United States. The club's position was that overpopulation was a significant factor in the degradation of the environment. Accordingly, the club supported stabilizing and reducing U.S. and world population. Some members argued that, as a practical matter, U.S. population could not be stabilized, let alone reduced, at the then-current levels of immigration. They urged the club to support immigration reduction. The club had previously addressed the issue of "mass immigration", and in 1988, the organization's Population Committee and Conservation Coordinating Committee stated that immigration to the U.S. should be limited, so as to achieve population stabilization.

Other Sierra Club members thought that the immigration issue was too far from the club's core environmentalist mission, and were also concerned that involvement would impair the organization's political ability to pursue its other objectives. In the mid 1990s, the club began gradually stepping away from the immigration restrictionist position, culminating with the board adopting a neutral position on immigration policy in 1996.  In 1998, 60.1% of Sierra Club voting members voted that the organization should remain neutral on America's immigration policies, while 39.2% supported a measure calling for stricter curbs on immigration to the United States.

After the 1996 board policy adoption, some members who were advocates of immigration reduction organized themselves as "SUSPS", a name originally derived from "Sierrans for U.S. Population Stabilization", which now stands for "Support U.S. Population Stabilization." SUSPS advocates a return to the Sierra Club's "traditional" (1970–1996) immigration policy stance. SUSPS has called for fully closing the borders of the United States, and for returning to immigration levels established by the Immigration Act of 1924, which includes strict ethnic quotas. David Brower also cited the club's position shift on immigration as one of the reasons for his resignation from the board in 2000. Supporters of immigration reduction within the club also charged that the board had abandoned the restrictionist position on immigration due to donations from investor David Gelbaum, who reportedly gave $200 million to the club between the mid 1990s and early 2000s and threatened Carl Pope in the mid 1990s to cease donations if they did not change their position on immigration adopted in 1988.

The controversy resurfaced when a group of three immigration reduction proponents ran in the 2004 Sierra Club Board of Directors election, hoping to move the club's position away from a neutral stance on immigration, and to restore the stance previously held. Groups outside of the club became involved, such as the Southern Poverty Law Center and MoveOn. Of the three candidates, two (Frank Morris and David Pimentel), were on the board of the anti-immigration group Diversity Alliance for a Sustainable America and two (Richard Lamm and Frank Morris) were on the board of directors or the board of advisors of the Federation for American Immigration Reform; both had also held leadership positions within the NAACP. Their candidacies were denounced by a fourth candidate, Morris Dees of the SPLC, as a "hostile takeover" attempt by "radical anti-immigrant activists." The immigration reduction proponents won 7% of all votes cast in the election. In 2005, members voted 102,455 to 19,898 against a proposed change to "recognize the need to adopt lower limits on migration to the United States."

With the increased number of progressive activists joining the club in recent years, the Sierra Club has dramatically shifted its stance on immigration further towards the affirmative. Today, the Sierra Club supports a path to citizenship for undocumented immigrants, opposes a border wall and works with immigrant groups to promote environmental justice.

The Sierra Club has been criticized by anti-immigration groups such as the Center for Immigration Studies and the Federation for American Immigration Reform (both of which are designated as hate groups by the SPLC) for opposing Trump's plan of creating a wall on the United States' southern border. These groups claim that the Sierra Club has criticized the plan for purely partisan reasons and not actually due to any environmental concerns.

Affiliates and subsidiaries
The Sierra Club Foundation was founded in 1960 by David R. Brower. A 501(c)(3) organization, it was founded after the Internal Revenue Service revoked the Sierra Club's tax-exempt status due to the group's political activities. The Sierra Club added its first Canadian chapter in 1963 and in 1989 opened a national office in Ottawa. Canadian affiliates of the Sierra Club operate under the Sierra Club Canada.

In 1971, volunteer lawyers who had worked with the Sierra Club established the Sierra Club Legal Defense Fund. This was a separate organization that used the "Sierra Club" name under license from the club; it changed its name to Earthjustice in 1997. The Sierra Student Coalition (SSC) is the student-run arm of the Sierra Club. Founded by Adam Werbach in 1991, it has 30,000 members. The Summer Program (SPROG) is a one-week leadership training program that teaches tools for environmental and social justice activism to young people across the country.
 The organization maintains a publishing imprint, Sierra Club Books. They also publish the John Muir library, which includes many of their founder's titles.

The Sierra Club Voter Education Fund is a 527 group that became active in the 2004 Presidential election by airing television advertisements about the major party candidates' positions on environmental issues. Through the Environmental Voter Education Campaign (EVEC), the club sought to mobilize volunteers for phone banking, door-to-door canvassing and postcard writing to emphasize these issues in the campaign.

Budget and funding 
The Sierra Club's annual budget was $88 million in 2011 and $100 million in 2012. In 2013, the group's budget was $97.8 million.

In 2008, Clorox donated $1.3 million to the Sierra Club in exchange for the right to display the Sierra Club's logo on a line of cleaning products.

In February 2012, it was reported that the Sierra Club had secretly accepted over $26 million in gifts from the natural gas industry, mostly from Aubrey McClendon, CEO of Chesapeake Energy. The Sierra Club used the Chesapeake Energy money for its Beyond Coal campaign to block new coal-fired power plants and close old ones. Michael Brune reported that he learned of the gifts after he succeeded Carl Pope as executive director of the Sierra Club in 2010. Brune reported that he ended the financial agreement with natural gas industry interests.

In 2013 Naomi Klein wrote on the club taking large, multi-million dollar funding from fossil fuel interests, had begun to spark "major controversy" within it and other "environmental" groups that were in similar receipt of fossil funding.

In 2014, the Energy and Environment Legal Institute filed a referral with the Internal Revenue Service pointing out that Sierra Club and Sierra Club Foundation were not paying income taxes from sales of solar panels for their partners across the US.

The Sierra Club has an affiliated super PAC. It spent $1,000,575 on the 2014 elections, all of it opposing Republican candidates for office. The Sierra Club is a partner of America Votes, an organization that coordinates and promotes progressive issues.

Donors to the Sierra Club have included David Gelbaum, Michael Bloomberg, the William and Flora Hewlett Foundation and the John D. and Catherine T. MacArthur Foundation. The Sierra Club has also received funding from the Democracy Alliance and the Tides Foundation Advocacy Fund.

In 2015, a PR group, known as the Environmental Policy Alliance, claimed that the Sierra Club and other U.S. environmental groups received funding from groups with ties to Russia's state-owned oil company.

Criticisms and controversies

Stance on housing 
The Sierra Club has come under criticism for opposing high-density housing development projects in California, which are intended to reduce the state's housing shortage and reduce greenhouse gas emissions. Ethan Elkind, director of the climate program at the Center for Law, Energy and the Environment (CLEE) at UC Berkeley Law, said that the Sierra Club's opposition to California Senate Bill 827 - which would require cities to allow denser and taller housing near public transport centers and ease the parking requirements that cities can impose on housing developments - was "surprising." He wrote, "is Sierra Club an organization of wealthy homeowners who want to keep newcomers out of their upscale, transit-rich areas? Or are they actually committed to fighting climate change by providing enough housing for Californians in low-carbon, infill areas? Because their opposition to SB 827 unfortunately indicates more of the former than the latter."

Potential foreign influence 
In late 2020, Representative Liz Cheney of Wyoming asked the Justice Department (DOJ) to investigate environmental groups such as the Sierra Club, saying that "robust political and judicial activism—combined with the fact that these groups often espouse views that align with those of our adversaries—makes it all the more critical that the Department is aware of any potential foreign influence within or targeting these groups."

Trips to Israel 
In early 2021, a variety of pro-Palestinian organizations demanded that the Sierra Club cancel "greenwashing" trips to "apartheid" Israel.  As a result, the Sierra Club announced cancellation of two forthcoming trips, but quickly reversed its decision, 
 saying it was "hastily" made, "without consulting a robust set of stakeholders".  It subsequently announced a rescheduled trip, which included visits to occupied Syrian and Palestinian land, although without stating that "these areas are illegally occupied by Israel".

Leadership

Presidents 
Presidents of the Sierra Club have included:

 1892–1914 John Muir
 1915–1917 Joseph N. LeConte
 1919–1922 William F. Badè
 1922–1924 Clair S. Tappaan
 1925–1927 Walter L. Huber
 1927–1928 Aurelia Harwood
 1928–1931 Duncan McDuffie
 1931–1933 Phil S. Bernays
 1933–1935 Francis P. Farquhar
 1936–1937 Ernest Dawson
 1937–1940 Joel H. Hildebrand
 1940–1941 Francis D. Tappaan
 1941–1943 Walter A. Starr
 1943–1946 Duncan McDuffie
 1946–1948 Bestor Robinson
 1948–1949 Francis P. Farquhar
 1949–1951 Lewis F. Clark
 1951–1953 Harold E. Crowe
 1953–1955 Richard M. Leonard
 1955–1957 Alexander Hildebrand
 1957–1959 Harold C. Bradley
 1959–1961 Nathan C. Clark
 1961–1964 Edgar Wayburn
 1964–1966 William E. Siri
 1966–1967 George Marshall
 1967–1969 Edgar Wayburn
 1969–1971 Phillip S. Berry
 1971–1973 Raymond Sherwin
 1973–1974 Laurence I. Moss
 1974–1976 Kent Gill
 1976–1977 Brant Calkin
 1977–1978 William Futrell
 1978–1980 Theodore Snyder
 1980–1982 Joseph Fontaine
 1982–1984 Denny Shaffer
 1984–1986 Michele Perrault
 1986–1988 Lawrence (Larry) Downing
 1988–1990 Richard Cellars
 1990–1991 Susan Merrow
 1991–1992 Phillip Berry
 1993–1994 Michele Perrault
 1994–1996 Robbie Cox
 1996–1998 Adam Werbach
 1998–2000 Chuck McGrady
 2000–2001 Robbie Cox
 2001–2003 Jennifer Ferenstein
 2003–2005 Larry Fahn
 2005–2007 Lisa Renstrom
 2007–2008 Robbie Cox
 2008–2010 Allison Chin
 2010–2012 Robin Mann
 2012–2013 Allison Chin
 2013–2015 Dave Scott
 2015–2017 Aaron Mair
 2017–2020 Loren Blackford
 2020– Ramón Cruz

Executive directors 
The Sierra Club's executive directors have included:

 1952–1969 David R. Brower
 1969–1985 J. Michael McCloskey
 1985–1986 Douglas Wheeler
 1987–1992 Michael L. Fischer
 1992–2010 Carl Pope
 2010–2021 Michael Brune

Directors 

 Ansel Adams, 1934–1971
 David Brower, 1941–1953; 1983–1988; 1995–2000
 William Edward Colby
 Leland Curtis 1943–1946
 George Davidson 1894–1910
 Glen Dawson
 Michael Dorsey 1997–2003; 2009–2010; 2014–2017
 Jim Dougherty
 William O. Douglas
 Veronica Eady, 1998–1999
 Anne H. Ehrlich
 Jules Eichorn
 Jennifer Ferenstein, 2001–2003
 Dave Foreman
 Lisa Force, 2003–2006
 Betsy Gaines, 1997–2000
 Marcia Hanscom, 2002–2005
 Chad Hanson, 1997–2003, 2018–
 David Starr Jordan
 Doug La Follette, 2003–2006
 Joseph LeConte, 1892–1898
 Richard M. Leonard
 Vivian Li
 Martin Litton, 1964–1973
 Norman Livermore
 Alexander George McAdie
 Duncan McDuffie
 Maryann Nelson
 Charlie Ogle, 1999–2002
 Eliot Porter
 Bestor Robinson
 Richard C. Sill
 William E. Siri
 Wallace Stegner
 René Voss, 1999–2002
 Adam Werbach
 Paul Watson, 2003–2006
 Bernie Zaleha, 2003–2009
 Ben Zuckerman, 2002–2005

See also 

 Biodiversity
 Conservation movement
 Conservation ethic
 Earth Science
 Ecology
 Ecosystem
 Environmental education
 Environmental movement
 Grassroots Campaigns, Inc.
 Habitat conservation
 List of environmental organizations
 List of recreational organizations
 Massachusetts v. Environmental Protection Agency
 Nature
 Recycling
 Sierra Club v. Morton
 Sustainability
 Timeline of environmental events

References

Further reading
 David Brower, For Earth's Sake: The Life and Times of David Brower (Salt Lake City: Peregrine Smith Books, 1990) 
 Michael McCloskey, In the Thick of It: My Life in the Sierra Club (Washington, DC: Island Press, 2005) 
 Tom Turner, Sierra Club: 100 Years of Protecting Nature (New York: Harry N. Abrams, Inc., 1991) 
 Holt-Atherton Special Collections John Muir Papers

External links 

 
 Sierra Club's Addup.org
 The Sierra Club Foundation
 Guide to the Sierra Club Members Papers at The Bancroft Library
 Finding Aid to Sierra Club Southwest Office records, 1900–2000, The Bancroft Library
 Finding Aid to the Sierra Club Board of Directors meeting minutes, 1892–1995, The Bancroft Library
 Finding Aid to John Muir Papers

 
Nature conservation organizations based in the United States
Environmental organizations based in the San Francisco Bay Area
Anti-nuclear organizations based in the United States
Anti–nuclear power movement
Climate change organizations based in the United States
Climbing organizations
Clubs and societies in California
Hiking organizations in the United States
History of California
John Muir
Water resource policy
Non-profit organizations based in California
527 organizations
Organizations based in San Francisco
Environmental organizations established in 1892
Sports organizations established in 1892
1892 establishments in California
International Campaign to Abolish Nuclear Weapons